2021–22 Iran Football's 2nd Division  is the 21st under 2nd Division since its establishment (current format) in 2001. The season featured 21 teams from the 2nd Division 2020–21, three new team relegated from the 2020–21 Azadegan League: Chooka Talesh, Navad Urmia, Gol Reyhan Alborz, and four new teams promoted from the 3rd Division 2020–21: Shahrdari Noshahr, Shahid Oraki Eslamshahr, Van Pars Naghsh-e-Jahan, Shohadaye Razakan Karaj. The draw for the league was held on 26 October 2021.
These changes has been applied before the season:

Teams

Stadia and locations

Number of teams by region

League table

Group A

Group B

2nd Division play-off

Leg 1

Leg 2 

Source=
Van Pars Naghshe Jahan won 3-2 on aggregate and promoted to 2022-23 Azadegan league

2nd Division  Final

Single Match

Notes

References

League 2 (Iran) seasons